Goodenia stephensonii is a species of flowering plant in the family Goodeniaceae and is endemic to north-eastern Queensland. It is an erect undershrub with narrow elliptic leaves and racemes of yellow flowers.

Description
Flowering mainly occurs from March to July.

Taxonomy and naming
Goodenia stirlingii was first formally described in 1904 by Frederick Manson Bailey in the Queensland Agricultural Journal from specimens collected by Dr. James Stirling near Herberton.

Distribution
This goodenia occurs in north-eastern Queensland.

References

stirlingii
Flora of Queensland
Plants described in 1904
Taxa named by Frederick Manson Bailey